Etanna basalis is a moth of the family Nolidae first described by Francis Walker in 1862. It is found in Borneo, Sri Lanka, Myanmar, Thailand, New Guinea, Australia, Vanuatu and Fiji.

Description
Its forewings have variable shades of pale gray and the hindwings are whitish. Its larval food plants are species of the genus Mangifera.

References

Moths of Asia
Moths described in 1862
Nolidae
Taxa named by Francis Walker (entomologist)